Tucker Hibbert (born June 24, 1984, in Driggs, Idaho) is a retired American snowmobile racer.

Hibbert has won 14 medals at the Winter X Games, including an all-event record nine-straight in the SnoCross event. He had been the youngest gold medal winner in Winter X Games history until Chloe Kim won the SuperPipe at age 14 in 2015.

In addition to his Winter X Games success, Hibbert is also a two-time (2010, 2012) FIM Snowcross World Champion and 10-Time United States National Snocross Champion.

He resides in Pelican Rapids, Minnesota.

References

External links
 
 X Games Profile

1984 births
Living people
X Games athletes
People from Driggs, Idaho
Sportspeople from Idaho
Snowmobile racers
People from Pelican Rapids, Minnesota